Bosingak is a large bell pavilion on Jongno in Seoul, South Korea.  The bell in Bosingak gives Jongno its name, which literally means "bell street".  It was originally constructed in 1396 but destroyed many times by both war and fire. It was designated Bosingak by Emperor Gojong in 1895.

In the Joseon Dynasty, this bell was at the center of the castle town. The bell was struck to announce the opening and closing of the four gates around Seoul. At 4 am and 10 pm the bell was struck 33 times and gates were opened and closed. It was used as a fire alarm as well. In modern times, the bell is rung only at midnight on New Year's Eve. Because of the massive number of people who attend this ceremony, Metro trains on Line 1 of the Seoul Subway do not stop at Jonggak Station on New Year's Eve.

History 
It was in 1398 (the 7th year of King Taejo's reign) that the bell was first hung in Hanyang during the Joseon Dynasty, and a bell that was cast in Gwangju was hung on the west side of Cheongungyo's bell tower.

Gallery

References

External links

Satellite View

Jongno District
Bells (percussion)
Pavilions
Buildings and structures in Seoul
Tourist attractions in Seoul